Mazina Delure (born 6 May 1948) is a Canadian rower. She competed in the women's eight event at the 1976 Summer Olympics.

References

1948 births
Living people
Canadian female rowers
Olympic rowers of Canada
Rowers at the 1976 Summer Olympics
Sportspeople from Amersfoort